Events from the year 1629 in Ireland.

Incumbent
Monarch: Charles I

Events
15 October – the Osborne Baronetcy, of Ballentaylor in the County of Tipperary, and Ballylemon in the county of Wexford, is created in the Baronetage of Ireland in favour of Richard Osborne.
26 December – the Archbishop of Dublin, Lancelot Bulkeley, the Mayor and a body of musketeers invade and suppress a clandestine friary in Cook Street, Dublin, during Solemn Mass.
A community of Colettine Poor Clares moves to Dublin.

Births
1 November – Oliver Plunkett, Roman Catholic Archbishop of Armagh and Primate of All Ireland, last Catholic martyr to die in England, canonised (executed 1681)
Ruaidhrí Ó Flaithbheartaigh, historian (d. 1716 or 1718)
Sir Henry Piers, baronet, soldier and antiquarian (d. 1691)

Deaths
4 March (bur) – Ambrose Ussher, Protestant scholar (b. c.1582)
18 June – Tiobóid na Long Bourke, 1st Viscount Mayo, clan chief (b. 1567)
18 November – Fláithrí Ó Maol Chonaire, Franciscan theologian (b. 1560)
Sir Paul Gore, 1st Baronet, politician (b. 1567)

References

 
1620s in Ireland
Ireland
Years of the 17th century in Ireland